Bust of Giovanni Vigevano is a marble sculptural portrait by the Italian artist Gian Lorenzo Bernini. The bust was produced between 1617 and 1618, and was then inserted into the tomb for Vigevano after he died in 1630. The tomb is in the church of Santa Maria sopra Minerva in Rome.

Gallery

See also
List of works by Gian Lorenzo Bernini

Notes

References

Further reading

External links

1630s sculptures
Busts in Italy
Marble sculptures in Italy
Busts by Gian Lorenzo Bernini